The Marr Sound Archives are an audio recording archive.

The collection includes extensive holdings of jazz, blues, country and popular music; historic voices and authors reading their own works; vintage radio programs; classical and opera. The Marr holds a wide range of historic formats including LPs, 78s, 45s, cylinders, transcription discs, instantaneous-cut discs and open-reel tapes. The archives maintain sound recordings for a number of archival for collections shared with LaBudde Special Collections.  The recordings in Marr, currently numbering over 325,000, do not circulate but listening stations are available in the Archives.

External links
 Marr Sound Archives Official website

Archives in the United States